Brandon P. Neuman is a politician from the U.S. Commonwealth of Pennsylvania. A member of the Democratic Party, he represented the 48th district in the Pennsylvania House of Representatives.

Personal life and education
Neuman graduated from Canon–McMillan High School in 2000. He earned a bachelor's in criminal justice from the University of Richmond in 2005. Neuman earned a master's degree from the University of Pittsburgh in 2005 and a J.D. from Duquesne University in 2009. Neuman played football for Canon–McMillan and the University of Richmond, suffering four documented concussions while playing fullback.

Career
Neuman was first elected to the Pennsylvania House in 2011. He represents Washington County, Pennsylvania, which is to the South of Pittsburgh. Neuman serves on the Agriculture & Rural Affairs, Consumer Affairs, Judiciary, Labor & Industry, and Rules committees.

Neuman introduced a bill that would require all student-athletes to receive baseline concussion screening at the beginning of each season. Neuman had been a critic of former Governor Tom Corbett's handling of the Penn State child sex abuse scandal. Along with fellow Representative Tony DeLuca, Neuman had introduced legislation to combat healthcare waste and fraud.

Neuman ran for Lieutenant Governor of Pennsylvania in 2014, but finished fifth in the Democratic primary.

Neuman resigned his state house seat in December 2017, after he was appointed as a Washington County judge.

References

External links

Twitter account
State Representative Brandon P. Neuman official caucus site
Brandon P. Neuman (D) official PA House site

Living people
Members of the Pennsylvania House of Representatives
University of Richmond alumni
University of Pittsburgh alumni
Duquesne University School of Law alumni
21st-century American politicians
Year of birth missing (living people)